The 1927 Brownlow Medal was the fourth year the award was presented to the player adjudged the fairest and best player during the Victorian Football League (VFL) home and away season. Syd Coventry of the Collingwood Football Club won the medal by polling seven votes during the 1927 VFL season.

Leading votegetters

References 

1927 in Australian rules football
1927